Katerýna Petrívna Chepúra (born December 23, 1986, Kyiv) is a Ukrainian theatrical director and social activist.

Biography 
Kateryna studied at school number 265 in Kyiv. In 2009, she finished directing and choreography studies in Kyiv National University of Culture and Arts and received director degree.

In 2008, Kateryna Chepura organized and managed a drama play called "Between the Two Forces" by Volodymyr Vynnychenko as her graduate project. The playreceived recognition and was performing at various stages several years (10th show — in November 2010). During this time, it has been viewed by numerous Ukrainian intellectuals and activists. The actor and art director of the Ivan Franko National Academic Drama Theater Bohdan Stupka, after watching this play, offered an internship opportunity to Kateryna.

In 2010, Kateryna Chepura started her internship at the Ivan Franko National Academic Drama Theater, from 2011 she began to work as a director in the theater. Since 2010, she organized two performances based on Volodymyr Vynnychenko's plays "A Way to Beauty" and "Natus" on the small stage and children's musical "Cinderella" on large stage. In 2011, "A Way to Beauty" play was nominated for theater award called "Kyiv's Pectoral" at "Best directing debut" nomination.

In September 2012, after Bohdan Stupka death, Kateryna was fired from the theater.

Social activism 

Kateryna Chepura was involved in social activities since she was 17 years old. Since 2004, she participated in the "PORA" (black) and after in "Alliance Maidan". Since 2010, she is an activist Civic movement "Vidsich".

Campaign "Against education degradation" 
January 24, 2012 - picket by Civic movement "Vidsich" as a part of campaign "Against education degradation" took place at the club of Cabinet of Ministers of Ukraine, during the meeting of Prime Minister Mykola Azarov with public and academic community membersin terms of discussion of government bill number 9655 "On Higher Education". By request of protesters, Kateryna Chepura was allowed to participate in the discussion as representative of students interests. Although most participants approved the final discussion paper and stated that it is ready for approval by the Verkhovna Rada, after hearing activist's requirements, Mykola Azarov still decided to create a work group to resolve "controversial norms" in the bill. The work group was formed, including Kateryna Chepura. Later, activist was accused of unauthorized organization of mass meeting that took place at the club of Cabinet of Ministers of Ukraine, January 24. April 4, 2012 – courtsession on Kateryna Chepura case in Pechersk Court of Kyiv. After 40-minutessession, court closed the case due to absence of evidence.

Campaign "Revenge for division of Ukraine" 
Kateryna Chepura was actively participating in the "Revenge for division of Ukraine" campaign in 2012. At June 18, police attempted to illegally detain Kateryna and other activists. In Novohrad-Volynskyi, protocol on administrative offense was unlawfully drawn up under police supervision but it didn't have any continuation.

August 3, Kateryna with another 4 activists was detained by police in Sevastopol. Law enforcement officials explained their actions by saying that activists organizedthis peaceful event without notification of the authorities. In police office, activists were accused in violation of Code of Ukraine on Administrative Offences, in particular for violation of election campaign rules. Later, after activists release, it became known that police committed protocols change, including protocol of Kateryna Chepura.

August 5, Kateryna Chepura and another activist were unlawfully detained by police in Simferopol. Activists were accused in violation of Code of Ukraine on Administrative Offences, in particular for violation of election campaign rules. The court found activistsguilty despite numerous mistakes in the protocol. Activists rejected their guilt and it was interpreted by judge as an attempt to evade responsibility. Later it became known that police committed forgery.

August 8, Kateryna Chepura with 6 activists was unlawfully detained by police in Donetsk. Police used brute physical force against the activist. Protocol on violation of Code of Ukraine on Administrative Offences was drawn up against Kateryna and other activists.

September 15, when distributing leaflets as a part of campaign in Kyiv, Kateryna and two other activists were beaten and detained by Solomyanskyi district police and unknown people in civilian clothes. At the police department Kateryna started to feel very bad, so ambulance was called to help her. Protocol on violation of Code of Ukraine on Administrative Offences, in particular on "persistent disobedience to police officers" was drawn up against activists. Later they were also accused in "violation of election campaign rules". All courts cases were won by Kateryna Chepura and other activists.

October 17, activists were distributing campaign leaflets in Korostyshiv during a concert of Honored Artist of Ukraine Oleh Havrylyuk in the local House of Culture. Journalists of 5 Kanal were not allowed to enter the hall, after what they wrote a statement to police about obstruction to journalistic activities and also provided further explanation. Activist Kateryna Chepura witnessed the incident and also was taking part in providing information to police. After these events, police started to investigate "Vidsich" leaflets distribution campaigns that was announced on 5 Kanal journalist Oksana Trokoz Facebook page. She started receiving questions about Kateryna Chepura and also she was told that there are criminal proceedings against "Vidsich". December 11, police interrogated Oksana Trokoz again and continued to ask about Kateryna Chepura. Journalist was provided with order for covert investigation (search) actions.

Euromaidan 

During and after Euromaidan, Kateryna Chepura was chotova (platoon commander) of "Women chota" (Women platoon) that was a part of the 16th sotnia of Self-Defense of the Maidan in Kyiv.

Theatrical activity

Directing 
Kateryna Chepura is director-producer of theatrical performances, mainly based on plays of Ukrainian writers.
At different stages:
"Between the Two Forces" (based on Volodymyr Vynnychenko).
As a director-producerin the Ivan Franko National Academic Drama Theater:
"A Way to Beauty" (based on Volodymyr Vynnychenko, premiere — April 10, 2010);
"Cinderella" (musical-tale, art director — Honored Artist Petro Ilchenko);
"Natus" (based on Volodymyr Vynnychenko, premiere — April 1, 2012).
As the director-producer in Kyiv-Mohyla Theatre Centre "Pasika":
"Boyarynya" (based on Lesia Ukrainka, premiere — October 6, 2013).
 "Kateryna" (based on Taras Shevchenko, premiere — August 23, 2015 on the 2nd festival "She.Fest" in Moryntsi).
At stage of The Moscow Drama Theater under the direction of Armen Dzhigarkhanyan:
The play "The Devil's School" (based on French dramatist Eric-Emmanuel Schmitt; presentation at the Second International Festival of Arts in Moscow — February 26, 2014).

Art Director 
Kateryna is often appears as an art director of her theatrical performances. For example, she was an art director and costume designer for plays "Natus" and "A Way to Beauty".

Family 
Kateryna is married since 2013. Her husband is Arthur Pereverzev.

External links 
 Kateryna Chepura — personal page on Facebook.
 Катерина Чепура — personal page on Vkontakte.

References 

Theatre people from Kyiv
Ukrainian theatre directors
Ukrainian human rights activists
Women human rights activists
Ukrainian women activists
People of the Euromaidan
1986 births
Living people
Vidsich